This is a list of films which placed number one at the weekend box office for the year 2020 in Thailand.

References

Thailand
2020 in Thailand
2020